Matthew Christian Morris (born August 9, 1974) is an American former professional baseball player. After playing nine seasons with the Cardinals, he played his last four seasons with the San Francisco Giants and the Pittsburgh Pirates.

Early life
Morris was born in Middletown, New York, the youngest of three children of George, a Vietnam War veteran and Local 580 ironworker, and Diane Morris. Both of his sisters played softball for the Wagner College Seahawks.

Morris moved to nearby Montgomery, New York, at 13 years old where he played baseball at Valley Central High School. After a strong performance while trying out at the Empire State Games, he was converted from an infielder to a pitcher. He was selected in the 25th round of the 1992 Major League Baseball draft by the Milwaukee Brewers, but chose instead to attend Seton Hall University and play college baseball for the Pirates under head coach Mike Sheppard. 

At Seton Hall, Morris was named first-team All-America as a junior by Baseball America and the American Baseball Coaches Association. He was teammates with Jason Grilli. In 1993, he played collegiate summer baseball in the Cape Cod Baseball League for the Hyannis Mets where he tossed a no-hitter to batterymate Jason Varitek and was named a league all-star.

Career

He was drafted 12th overall in the June 1995 draft by the St. Louis Cardinals. In 1996, led the Texas League with 4 shutouts while pitching for the Double-A Arkansas Travelers and led all Cardinal minor league pitchers with 175 innings pitched. In 1997, he reached the majors after only one game at Triple-A Louisville. In his first season, he won 12 games with a 3.19 ERA and finished tied for second in the Rookie of the Year voting, behind Scott Rolen.

In , he underwent Tommy John surgery after he was injured in spring training. He won 22 games with 185 strikeouts and a 3.16 ERA. In , he won 17 games and made his second All-Star appearance.

In , Morris signed a one-year contract after he won 15 games on a Cardinals team that made the World Series. In 2004, he lost 10 games for the first time in his career and had a 4.72 ERA, also a career high.

Morris underwent surgery during the 2004/ off-season and started the season 8–0 with a 3.16 ERA, and was 10–2 with a 3.10 ERA at the time of the All-Star break. In fact, he was considered by many to be snubbed for the All-Star game. Morris went 4–7 with a 5.55 ERA after the All-Star break. He was the number three starter for the Cardinals in the playoffs, behind ace Chris Carpenter and Mark Mulder. He became the first winning pitcher in a postseason game at Petco Park when the Cardinals defeated the San Diego Padres in Game 3 of the 2005 NLDS. In the thin free agent market of the 2005/ off-season, Morris was touted as one of the best available pitchers.

On December 12, 2005, Morris signed a three-year contract with the San Francisco Giants worth $27 million. He had an injury-filled year with the Giants in 2006, going 10–15 with a 4.98 ERA.

Prior to the  season, Morris changed his uniform number from 35, which he had worn for his entire career, to wear number 22 as a tribute to retired former teammate Mike Matheny. Rich Aurilia took the number 35 jersey.

On July 31, 2007, Morris was traded to the Pittsburgh Pirates for center field prospect Rajai Davis and pitcher Stephen MacFarland.

Morris started off the 2008 season with a 0–4 record and a 9.67 ERA in five starts. On April 27, 2008, Morris was released by the Pirates. He retired three days later, on April 30, .

Personal life
Morris married the former Heather Reader on December 7, 2002, and together they have four children, Lola Morris, Sydney Morris, Harper Morris, Peyton Morris. As of 2014, they lived in Big Sky, Montana. He also has a 21 year old son named Brandon who currently lives in St. Louis.

See also

 List of Major League Baseball annual wins leaders
 List of St. Louis Cardinals team records

References

External links

1974 births
Living people
Major League Baseball pitchers
St. Louis Cardinals players
Seton Hall Pirates baseball players
San Francisco Giants players
Pittsburgh Pirates players
Baseball players from New York (state)
National League All-Stars
National League wins champions
Hyannis Harbor Hawks players
St. Petersburg Cardinals players
New Jersey Cardinals players
Arkansas Travelers players
Louisville Redbirds players
Memphis Redbirds players
Palm Beach Cardinals players
People from Middletown, Orange County, New York
All-American college baseball players
Sportspeople from the New York metropolitan area